Tomislav Simović (Serbian Cyrillic: Томислав Симовић; born 1933) is a retired Lieutenant colonel general of the Yugoslav People's Army and independent politician. He served as the Serbian Minister of Defence from 31 July 1991 to 23 December 1991.

Simović served as a career officer in the Yugoslav People' Army (JNA), attaining the rank of Lieutenant colonel general. He commanded the JNA Third military region headquartered in Skopje, SR Macedonia before replacing Commander Miodrag Jokić as Serbia's Minister of Defence in the cabinet of Dragutin Zelenović. During his tenure, Simović was allegedly involved with supporting Serb paramilitary forces, and composing a draft law for the establishment of a Serbian Army.

Simović was ousted from office following the fall of Zelenović's government in late 1991 and retired from active military duties in 1992. In 1993 Simović co-founded the Association of Military Pensioners of Serbia and served as the organization's first  President from 1993-1995.

References

1935 births
Living people
Defence ministers of Serbia